Duets: The Final Chapter (sometimes referred as The Biggie Duets) is the second posthumous album by late American rapper The Notorious B.I.G., and is a collection of songs featuring appearances of other prominent rappers. The album was released by Bad Boy Records and Atlantic Records in the UK on December 19, 2005, and in the US on December 20 and charted at #3 selling 438,000 copies, beaten by the extremely high sales of Jamie Foxx's Unpredictable and Mary J. Blige's The Breakthrough. In the UK it climbed as high as #13 after the release of the album's first single "Nasty Girl". It is his second posthumous album that was certified platinum.

The album featured orchestrated duets between Biggie and a number of popular rappers and singers, much like the previous LP Born Again (1999). Biggie's lyrics come from studio pieces of some of the songs he created during his life (his verse from "Notorious Thugs" in "Spit Your Game"), along with some less common lyrics (a freestyle from a promotional tape on "Hustler's Story"), & unreleased material (Biggie's verse in "Living in Pain" comes from an unreleased song from Ready to Die called "House of Pain") all remixed into duets. The package also included a DVD featuring previously unreleased performance footage and several of Biggie's music videos.

Critical reception

The album received mixed reviews by critics; Peter Relic of Rolling Stone gave the album 2 out of 5 stars, commenting that the title was inaccurate because the major presence of other artists overshadowed The Notorious B.I.G.'s presence. Relic believed that the guest appearances don't add much substance. Andy Kellman of Allmusic rated the album 2.5 out of 5. Soren Baker of Los Angeles Times gave it two stars out of four. However, Steve Jones of USA Today gave it all four stars. Method Man, in particular, was a huge critic of the album, stating that "they got niggas on that album Big would have never rocked with, for real. " He also brought up the fact that he was the only other rapper that Biggie chose to have on his debut album Ready to Die.

Singles
The album's first single was "Nasty Girl", featuring P Diddy, Nelly, Jagged Edge, Avery Storm, Jazze Pha, and Fat Joe. It took Biggie's vocal samples from his song "Nasty Boy". The single climbed to #1 in the UK in its second week of release, where it stayed for 2 weeks and became his first and only #1 single there. The single also helped the album climb to #13 and therefore, Duets: The Final Chapter became his highest-charting album to date there, out peaking the #23 position of Life After Death. In the US, "Nasty Girl" made #45 on the Billboard Hot 100 and the single also made the top 20 in Australia.

The second single from the album is "Spit Your Game", featuring Twista and Krayzie Bone, a double A-side single with "Hold Ya Head", a duet with Bob Marley, which was originally the b-side to "Nasty Girl" in the UK and Australia. "Spit Your Game" is a remake of the Biggie song "Notorious Thugs". "Hold Ya Head" was produced by Clinton Sparks, and features a sample of reggae band The Wailers' song "Johnny Was" from their Rastaman Vibration album. It features Biggie's vocal samples from "Suicidal Thoughts".

Track listing
Credits adapted from the album's liner notes.

Notes
 signifies a co-producer
 signifies an additional producer

Notes/Vocal sample sources
Biggie's vocals from "It Has Been Said" come from "Victory"
Biggie's vocals from "Spit Your Game" come from "Notorious Thugs"
Biggie's vocals from "Whatchu Want" come from an unreleased song called "Whatchu Want"
Biggie's vocals from "Get Your Grind On" come from "My Downfall"
Biggie's vocals from "Living the Life" come from "Let Me Get Down"
Biggie's vocals from "1970 Somethin come from "Respect"
Biggie's vocals from "Nasty Girl" come from "Nasty Boy"
Biggie's and 2Pac's vocals from "Living in Pain" come from an unreleased song called "House of Pain"
Biggie's vocals from "I'm With Whateva" come from "Ready to Die"
Biggie's vocals from "Beef" come from "What's Beef?"
Biggie's vocals from "Hustler's Story" come from an unreleased song called "You'll See"
Biggie's vocals from "Breakin' Old Habits" come from "Young G's"
Biggie's vocals from "Ultimate Rush" come from "Why You Tryin' to Play Me?" released by Xtra Large Entertainment(Derrick Hodge and LeTroy Davis) and "Drugs"
Biggie's vocals from "Mi Casa" come from "Friend of Mine"
Biggie's vocals from "Hold Ya Head" come from "Suicidal Thoughts"
Biggie's vocals from "Just a Memory" come from "You're Nobody ('Til Somebody Kills You)" and "Come On"
Biggie's vocals from "Wake Up" come from "If I Should Die Before I Wake" and "Kick in the Door"
Biggie's vocals from "Want that Old Thing Back" come from "One More Chance"
Biggie's vocals from "Running Your Mouth" come from an unreleased song called "Whatchu Want"
Biggie's vocals from "Stop The Break" come from an unreleased song called "Stop The Break" by Ron G

Credited samples
"It Has Been Said"
"Victory" by Puff Daddy featuring The Notorious B.I.G
"Spit Your Game"
"My Ship Is Coming In" by Walter Jackson
"Living the Life"
"Take Time To Tell Her" by Jerry Butler
"Living in Pain"
"Blue Sky Silver Bird" by Lamont Dozier
"I'm With Whateva"
"Halloween" by John Carpenter
"Ultimate Rush"
 "Drugs" by Lil' Kim
"Beef"
"My Other Love" by Bunny Sigler
"Hold Ya Head"
"Johnny Was" by Bob Marley

Unused tracks
 "The Grind" ''(featuring 50 Cent) — Later released on 50 Cent's 2006 mixtape "The Empires Strikes Back" with Statik Selektah & G-Unit Records.
 "The Funk" (featuring Redman, Busta Rhymes & Nate Dogg) — Later released on Redman's 2010 mixtape "Pancake & Syrup" without Busta Rhymes as a feature.
 "Make It Hot" (featuring Ness & Aasim)
 "Here We Go" (featuring Q-Tip, Babs & Aasim)
 "Bust A Nut" (featuring Too Short & Webbie)
 "Three Bricks" (featuring Ghostface Killah & Raekwon) — Later released as a bonus track on Ghostface Killah's 2006 album "Fishscale".
 "God's Callin' Me" (featuring Canibus, Immortal Technique & Noreaga)
 "(Unknown track)" featuring Lil Cease
 "It's Not A Game" featuring 2Pac, Big L & Big Pun

Charts

Weekly charts

Year-end charts

Certifications

References

External links
 Billboard.com
 
 Rapcityz.com

The Notorious B.I.G. albums
2005 albums
Remix albums published posthumously
Vocal duet albums
Bad Boy Records albums
Atlantic Records albums
Albums produced by Scott Storch
Albums produced by Swizz Beatz
Albums produced by Just Blaze
Albums produced by Danja (record producer)
Albums produced by Eminem
Albums produced by Jazze Pha
Albums produced by Chink Santana
Albums produced by Havoc (musician)
Albums produced by Atticus Ross
Albums produced by DJ Green Lantern
Albums produced by Scram Jones
Albums produced by Dre & Vidal